Malaxa may refer to:

Malaxa, Crete, a village in the Chania regional unit on Crete, Greece
Malaxa Mountain, a landform at Malaxa on the island of Crete, Greece
Malaxa (car), Romanian car

People with the surname
Nicolae Malaxa (1884–1965), Romanian engineer and industrialist